Jan Frycz (born 15 May 1954) is a Polish screen and stage actor. He was nominated for six Polish Academy Awards, winning twice for his supporting roles in the films Pornografia (2003) and The Welts (2004).

Biography 
Frycz's father was a mining engineer and disliked his interest in acting; he argued that a boy should have a more stable job. Despite his father's wishes, Frycz pursued acting and graduated from the AST National Academy of Theatre Arts in Kraków in 1978. He made his theatre debut in the same year in the Juliusz Słowacki Theatre where he continued performing in the years 1978-82 and 1984-89.

He spent two years in 1982-84 working in Warsaw at the National Theatre and the Polish Theatre, before returning to Kraków where he continued working at the Juliusz Słowacki Theatre, and from 1989 till 2006 at the National Stary Theatre.

He made his screen debut in Norwegian film Dagny in 1976. In the second half of the 1970s and 1980s, he focused mainly on his theatre work, playing only a few, mostly episodic roles.

Since 2006, he is an actor of the National Theatre in Warsaw.

Frycz is married to his third wife and has a daughter from the first marriage and four children from the second marriage. His daughters Gabriela and Olga are actresses.

Awards 

 2005 – Silver Medal for Merit to Culture – Gloria Artis
 2005 – Order of Polonia Restituta
 2015 – Silver Medal for Merit to Culture – Gloria Artis

Selected filmography

References

External links
 
 Profile on filmpolski.pl 
Profile at culture.pl

1954 births
Living people
Male actors from Kraków
Polish male film actors
Polish male stage actors
Recipients of the Order of Polonia Restituta
20th-century Polish male actors
21st-century Polish male actors
Polish television actors
Recipients of the Silver Medal for Merit to Culture – Gloria Artis
Recipients of the Gold Medal for Merit to Culture – Gloria Artis